Riverside is an unincorporated community in Linn County, Oregon. It lies at an elevation of 223 feet (68 m).

References

Unincorporated communities in Linn County, Oregon
Unincorporated communities in Oregon
Populated places on the Willamette River